Ian Cockbain may refer to:

 Ian Cockbain (cricketer, born 1987) (born 1987), English (Gloucestershire) cricketer
 Ian Cockbain (cricketer, born 1958) (1958–2022), English cricketer, father of the above